Aunt Lute Books is an American multicultural feminist press based in San Francisco, California. The publisher also seeks to work with and support first-time authors.

Publishing history
In 1982, Aunt Lute Book Company was founded by Barb Wieser and Joan Pinkvoss in Iowa.

Aunt Lute merged with Spinsters Ink, another feminist publisher, in 1986, and the two organizations published jointly for several years in San Francisco under the name Spinsters/Aunt Lute. In 1990 the Aunt Lute Foundation was established as a non-profit publishing program. 

In 1992, Spinsters Ink was purchased by lesbian feminist philanthropist Joan Drury and moved to Minneapolis.

Aunt Lute continues to operate independently as a nonprofit to the present day.

Titles
Aunt Lute has published a number of high-profile feminist and lesbian authors, including Audre Lorde (The Cancer Journals), Gloria Anzaldúa (Borderlands/La Frontera: The New Mestiza), Melanie Kaye/Kantrowitz, LeAnne Howe (Shell Shaker, winner of the 2002 Before Columbus American Book Award, and Miko Kings: An Indian Baseball Story), Alice Walker, and Paula Gunn Allen.

Call Me Woman, the autobiography of South African activist Ellen Kuzwayo, Radmila Manojlovic Zarkovic's anthology, I Remember: Writings by Bosnian Women Refugees, and Cherry Muhanji's Lambda Award-winning novel Her have also been published by Aunt Lute. 

Other Aunt Lute titles include the first U.S. collection of Filipina/Filipina American women writers and the first collection of Southeast Asian women writers, as well as a number of translated texts.

Other titles are listed below:
A Simple Revolution; by Judy Grahn
Alice Walker Banned; by Alice Walker
Beautiful and Dark; by Rosa Montero and Trans Adrienne Mitchell
Borderlands/La Frontera (Fourth Edition); by Gloria Anzaldúa
Call me Woman; by Ellen Kuzwayo
Cancer Journals; by Audre Lorde
flesh to bone; by ire'ne lara silva
Gulf Dreams; by Emma Perez
Haggadah; by Martha Shelley
Hot Chicken Wings; by Jyl Lynn Felman
Her; by Cherry Muhanji
The Issue is Power; by Melanie Kaye Kantrowitz
My Jewish Face; by Melanie Kaye Kantrowitz
Junglee Girl; by Ginu Kamani
Lowest Blue Flame Before Nothing; by Lara Stapleton
Maidenhome; by Ding Xiaoqi
Me as her again; Nancy Agabian
Miko Kings: An Indian Baseball Story; by LeAnne Howe
The Storyteller with Nike Airs; by Kleya Forte-Escamilla
Shell Shaker; by LeAnne Howe
Send My Roots Rain; by Ibis Gomez-Vega
Singing Softly/Cantando Bajito; by Carmen de Monteflores
Teaching at the Crossroads; by Laurie Grobman
Transforming Feminist Practice: Non-Violence, Social Justice, and the Possibilities of a Spiritualized Feminism; by Leela Fernandes
The Two Mujeres; by Sara Levi Calderon
Teacher at Point Blank: Confronting Sexuality, Violence, and Secrets in a Suburban School; by Jo Scott-Coe
The Way We Make Sense; by Dawn Karima Pettigrew
White Snake and Other Stories; by Geling Yan
The Woman Who Owned the Shadows; by Paula Gunn Allen

Anthologies and collections
Babaylan: An Anthology of Filipina and Filipina American Writers" Eds. Nick Carbo and Eileen TabiosCity of One: Young Writers Speak to the World; by WritersCorpsEl Mundo Zurdo; Eds. Norma E. Cantu, Christina L. Gutierrez, Norma Alarcón and Rita E. Urquijo-RuizEl Mundo Zurdo 2; El Mundo Zurdo 3; Frontline Feminism; Ed. Karen KahnGood Girls Marry Doctors. Ed. Piyali BhattacharyaImaniman: Poets Writing in the Anzaldúan Borderlands, (2016), Eds. ire'ne lara silva and Dan Vera with an introduction by United States Poet Laureate Juan Felipe HerreraMaking Face, Making Soul/Haciendo Caras; Ed. Gloria AnzaldúaNew Voices 1; by DeeAnne Davis, Rabie Harris, and Gloria YamatoOur Feet Walk the Sky; by Women of South Asian Descent Collective (WOSAD)Positive/Negative: Women of Color and HIV/AIDS; Eds. Imani Harrington and Chyrell BellamyRadical Acts: Theatre and Feminist Pedagogies of Change; Eds. Anne Elizabeth Armstrong and Kathleen JuhlShadow on a Tightrope; Eds. Lisa Schoenfielder and Barb WieserSolid Ground; by WritersCorpsThe Aunt Lute Anthology of U.S. Women Writers, Volume One: 17th through 19th Centuries; Eds. Lisa Maria Hogeland and Mary KlagesThe Aunt Lute Anthology of U.S. Women Writers, Volume Two; Eds. Lisa Maria Hogeland and Shay BrownThe Judy Grahn Reader; By Judy GrahnThe Unforgetting Heart: An Anthology of Short Stories by African American Women (1859-1993); Ed. Asha KanwarThrough the Eye of the Deer: An Anthology of Native American Women Writers; Eds. Carolyn Dunn and Carol ComfortReclaiming Medusa: Short Stories by Contemporary Puerto Rican Women''; Ed. Diana Velez

Awards
Aunt Lute Books was the 2004 - 2005 and the 2005 - 2006 Best of the Small Presses Award granted by Standards, an International Cultural Studies Magazine.

External links
 Aunt Lute Books

References

Book publishing companies based in San Francisco
Feminism in California
Feminist book publishing companies
Feminist organizations in the United States
Mission District, San Francisco
Multicultural feminism
Organizations based in San Francisco
Publishing companies established in 1982
Women in Iowa
1982 establishments in California